True Confessions of a Hollywood Starlet is a 2008 American comedy-drama television film directed by Tim Matheson, based on the young adult novel of the same name by author Lola Douglas. The film stars Joanna "JoJo" Levesque and Valerie Bertinelli. It premiered on August 9, 2008, on Lifetime.

Plot
Teenage actress Morgan Carter is a Hollywood princess, until the day that her hard-partying ways get the best of her. After she collapses outside of a Hollywood nightclub, Morgan's mother sends her to live in the wilds of Fort Wayne, Indiana, with her Aunt Trudy. Morgan is camouflaged into Claudia Miller and given a new hairstyle, and suddenly, Morgan, albeit unwillingly, blends in with her peers who do not own televisions or read magazines.

With a new appearance and no money, Morgan enters a suburban high school with a bad attitude. She initially does not fit in with anyone, until she meets Eli and they became friends. Eli introduces Claudia to his sister and her friends. Morgan takes a liking to Emily, Eli's sister, and they become good friends. Emily invites Morgan to a sleepover where Debbie, who likes Eli, tells her to stay away from him. Morgan is upset so she leaves early, without telling Emily. When she gets home, she calls her mother for help. Instead of her mother, she gets her new stepfather on the phone. He just happens to be her manager, Sam. After this discovery she comes to the misguided theory that Sam wanted her to leave Hollywood so he could marry her mom. Soon she drinks a bottle of vodka that she found in the cupboard. The next day when Eli comes over to tutor Morgan and she, wanting desperately to capture Eli's attention, makes up a story about her father, borrowing a plot from one of her movies. Eli is  worried, as Morgan drastically exaggerated and added several negative details about her supposed "father", telling Morgan to alert him if he shows up. Eli asks Morgan on a date (partly out of pity) to the fair and she happily accepts. Morgan's best friend from when she was in Hollywood, Marissa, comes to visit her in Indiana, where they go to a club. Morgan goes to the fair with Eli and Morgan begins liking him more. Everything was going great until Debbie tries to blackmail Morgan. The paparazzi finds out where she is and leak the story so she sneaks to Eli's house to apologize for lying, both about her father and about not being Claudia. Eli is upset at the deception, but in the end he forgives her and they drive away on his motorcycle.

Pop culture references
The film makes references to several teen films, television dramas, and reality shows such as Mean Girls, Die Hard, Legally Blonde, Bring it On, Monster Garage, The Surreal Life, and Grey's Anatomy. Also referenced in the film are Lindsay Lohan, Perez Hilton, Britney Spears, Sarah Michelle Gellar and Oscar-winning directors Steven Spielberg, Quentin Tarantino and Steven Soderbergh. The soundtrack featured songs like "Bubbly" by Colbie Caillat, "SOS" by Rihanna, "Funplex" by The B-52's and "My World" by Emigrate.

Cast
 Joanna "JoJo" Levesque as Morgan Carter/Claudia Miller
 Ian Nelson as Eli Walsh
 Justin Louis as Sam
 Lynda Boyd as Bianca
 Shenae Grimes as Marissa Dahl
 Jennifer Miller as Bully
 Melanie Leishman as Emily
 Leah Cudmore as Debbie
 Valerie Bertinelli as Aunt Trudy
 Dayna Devon as Herself
 Jonathan Higgins as Mr. Sappey
 Jonathan Potts as Principal Bowman
 Zain Meghji as Lux Movie Host
 Victoria Snow as Gaby
 Mary Kitchen as Local Reporter
 Billy Turnbull as Dan
 Rebecca Amare as Bethany
 Mike 'Nug' Nahrgang as Stan
 Araxi Arslanian as Cashier
 Dan Duran as Dave
 Kathryn Haggis as Lisa

Release dates

References

External links
 
 
 TV Guide Page

2000s teen comedy-drama films
2008 television films
2008 films
American teen comedy-drama films
American comedy-drama television films
Films about actors
Films based on young adult literature
Films set in Indiana
Films shot in Ontario
Lifetime (TV network) films
2008 drama films
Films directed by Tim Matheson
2000s American films
2000s English-language films